Arkansas Highway 385 is a designation for two state highways in White County, Arkansas. The southern segment of  runs from Griffithville to Kensett. A northern segment of  runs from Highway 367 in Judsonia to Plainview.

Route description

Griffithville to Kensett
Highway 385 begins in Griffithville at Highway 11. The route passes two properties on the National Register of Historic Places: the J.A. Neaville House and A.J. Smith House. The route heads north to Highway 87 in Kensett, where it terminates.

Judsonia to Plainview
Arkansas Highway 385 begins in Judsonia at Highway 367. Highway 385 runs south as Judson Ave, passing the Grand Army of the Republic Memorial within Evergreen Cemetery, the Judsonia High School Gymnasium near Judsonia High School, and the Judsonia Community Building Historic District.  The route runs south until reaching the Little Red River, after which the road turns west and becomes Hopkins Dr. Highway 385 continues west, intersecting first Highway 367 and US 67/US 167 (Future I-57) further west. The highway next turns north to terminate at Highway 157 at Plainview.

Highway 385 within Judsonia was formerly US 67 City, and earlier US 67, a mainline cross-country auto route. The history is still apparent today from the numerous properties along its curbs listed on the National Register of Historic Places.

Major intersections

|-
| align=center colspan=5 | AR 385 northern segment begins in Judsonia
|-

History
Arkansas Highway 385 first became a state highway in 1966. The graded dirt route ran north from US 67 to Plainview. The segment in downtown Judsonia was designated U.S. Route 67 City at this time. (US 67 City was a former alignment of US 67.) The southerly route of Highway 385 was first built as a graded dirt road across Cypress Bayou in 1966, but was not yet designated a state highway. The following year, Highway 385 was paved from the US 67/US 67C intersection to Plainview. The southerly route was added to the system in 1970, and paved in 1973. In 1976, US 67 was moved slightly west into today's US 67/US 167 alignment, with the former highway becoming Highway 367. This realignment meant the US 67C needed to be redesignated, and it became Highway 385.

References

385
Transportation in White County, Arkansas
U.S. Route 67